The Ethics of Immigration is a September 2013 book by the philosopher Joseph Carens.

Structure of the book
The first eight chapters of the book argue for a robust system of migrant rights and equal treatment of migrants and natives, while conceding the legitimacy of nation-states and their discretionary control over migration. The ninth and tenth chapter discuss illegal immigrants, family reunification, and refugees. The eleventh chapter argues for open borders, and challenges the presumption of discretionary control over migration, while still staying within the framework of legitimacy of nation-states.

Reception

Interviews and self-promotion
Dylan Matthews interviewed Carens on his book for the Wonkblog section of the Washington Post. Carens was also interviewed about the book for New Books in Philosophy.

Book reviews

In April 2014, Notre Dame Philosophical Reviews published a review of the book by Arash Abizadeh. In late May 2014, the Crooked Timber blog hosted a symposium on the book, with contributions from Chris Bertram, Kenan Malik, Ryan Pevnick, Phillip Cole, Speranta Dumitru, Sarah Fine, Jo Shaw, Brian Weatherson, and others. Carens responded to the critiques in two blog posts.

References

2013 non-fiction books
Contemporary philosophical literature
Ethics literature
Non-fiction books about immigration
Oxford University Press books